Licina is a surname and species name.

Surname
Dusan Licina (born 1986), Serbian engineer
Enad Ličina (born 1979), Serbian boxer
John Licina (born 1976), French footballer
Luiza Licina-Bode (born 1972), German politician
Mladen Ličina (born 1991), Serbian footballer

Species name
Emozamia licina, a sea snail
Odostomia licina, a sea snail
Pyrgulopsis licina, a freshwater snail
Sphegina licina, a hoverfly